Comadres (CoMadres) is the committee of mothers and relatives of prisoners, the disappeared and the politically assassinated of El Salvador. It was established in December, 1977, with the help of the Catholic Archdiocese of San Salvador and the Archbishop Óscar Romero, to discover the truth behind the missing relatives of the membership. Among
their activities are the distribution of flyers to get out the message, and the occupation of government offices to elicit the help of foreign nations in pressuring the Salvadoran government. By 1993, there were an estimated 500 or more members. A leader of this organisation was María Teresa Tula.

The offices of the committee were subject to police raids by the government, and the members were allegedly subject to systematic rape in order to destroy the organization. A total of about 48 members were abducted by death squads and subject to torture and rape. Of these, five were assassinated.

In 1984, Comadres received the Robert F. Kennedy Center for Justice and Human Rights Award for individuals or groups around the world who show courage and have made a significant contribution to human rights in their country.

In 1986, Bono of the rock band U2 paid tribute to their cause, and a similar group in Nicaragua, by writing the song "Mothers of the Disappeared", which was released in 1987 on The Joshua Tree.

References

Enforced disappearance
Robert F. Kennedy Human Rights Award laureates